This article lists the episodes from the anime series Pani Poni Dash! which aired in Japan on TV Tokyo between July 4, 2005 and December 26, 2005. Each episode ends with a still image drawn by Japanese illustrators of anime, manga, and visual novels; these are listed below as endcards. The anime has since been licensed by United States based company Funimation in North America and ADV Films in the United Kingdom. King Records subsidiary Starchild has the video and music rights for the anime. A special OVA was released with DVD box set containing the anime series, on April 15, 2009. Funimation released a complete DVD box set on March 10, 2009. On October 26, 2010, Funimation re-released the complete series as a part of their Super Amazing Value Edition line-up.

The series was directed by Akiyuki Shinbo and Shin Oonuma at Shaft. Kenichi Kanemaki was the series composition writer, Kei Haneoka composed the music , and Kazuhiro Oota designed the characters and acted as chief animation director. A number of episodes were outsourced outside of Shaft: episodes 2, 5, 9, 13, 17, and 21 to Chaos Project; episodes 3 and 11 to No Side; episodes 4, 10, 15, 20, and 25 to Studio Pastoral; episodes 7 and 12 to Studio Tama; and episodes 18 and 23 to Mushi Production.

Episode list

Notes

References

Pani Poni Dash!